Sadhurangam may refer to:

 Sadhurangam (1978 film)
 Sadhurangam (2011 film)